Gene A Mueller (born February 28, 1942) is an American historian and author.
Mueller was born in Milwaukee, Wisconsin and is considered an expert in two areas of history, American Nez Perce Indian Culture and 20th Century Europe, specifically Hitler's generals.  He has published several books.  He has taught at the Lewis-Clark State College in Lewiston, Idaho, Henderson State University at Arkadelphia, Arkansas, and Texas A&M University–Texarkana.

Mueller was also Mayor of Lewiston Idaho for ten years from 1982 to 1992.

Education
He has the following degrees: 
 B.A., University of Missouri–Kansas City
 M.A., University of Oregon
 Ph.D., University of Idaho

Books
 Hitler's Commanders, Samuel W. Mitcham, Gene Mueller, Publisher: Cooper Square Publishers
 Wilhelm Keitel: The Forgotten Field Marshal, Gene Mueller, Publisher: Cooper Square Publishers
 Lewiston: From packtrains and tent saloons to highways and brick stores : a century of progress, 1861-1962, Gene Mueller, 
 Lewiston: A pictorial history, Gene Mueller, 
 Natives, migrants, and immigrants: Lewiston's cultural heritage and early society, Gene Mueller,

Personal
Mueller is married to Kathleen C. (Keegan) Mueller, and has three sons, Barry, Jason, Matthew.

External links
 Dr. Mueller's page at Texas A&M University in Texarkana
Lewis-Clark State College
Henderson State University

1942 births
21st-century American historians
21st-century American male writers
Henderson State University faculty
Living people
University of Idaho alumni
University of Missouri–Kansas City alumni
University of Oregon alumni
American male non-fiction writers